Peral was the first successful full electric battery-powered submarine, built by the Spanish engineer and sailor Isaac Peral for the Spanish Navy, in Arsenal de la Carraca (today's Navantia). The first fully capable military submarine, she was launched 8 September 1888. She had one torpedo tube (and two torpedoes) and an air regeneration system. Her hull shape, propeller, periscope, torpedo launcher and cruciform external controls anticipated later designs. With fully charged batteries, she was the fastest submarine yet built, with underwater performance levels (except for range) that matched those of First World War U-boats for a very short period, before her batteries began to drain. Although advanced in many ways, Peral lacked a means of charging batteries while underway, such as an internal combustion engine, thus had a very limited endurance and range. In June 1890, Peral's submarine launched a torpedo while submerged. It was also the first submarine to incorporate a fully reliable underwater navigation system. However, conservatives in the Spanish naval hierarchy terminated the project despite two years of successful tests. Her operational abilities have led some to call her the first U-boat.

Peral was withdrawn from service in 1890 and is now preserved at the Cartagena Naval Museum.

Conception

Peral was first conceived on 20 September 1884, when Lieutenant Isaac Peral y Caballero wrote a paper which would become his  ("Project for a submarine torpedo boat").

After several studies and experiments, and having gained support from his superiors and fellow officers, Peral exposed his idea to the Spanish navy staff. He wrote a letter to the Spanish naval minister, Vice Admiral Pezuela y Lobo, in September, 1885. Pezuela called Peral to Madrid to have a personal interview with him. After the interview Pezuela agreed to finance Peral's preliminary studies in Cádiz with an initial budget of 5,000 pesetas, before launching a program to build a full-scale submarine.

The first study consisted of human breath test in an enclosure for several hours. A room of  square meters was used, with an air storage cell, loaded to 79 atmospheres and a storage capacity of 0.5 m3. In addition to instruments to measure the temperature and moisture, there was a tube to re-oxygenate the air supply to the crew through a  waterproof cloak and three water buckets to maintain the moisture. Six people locked themselves inside the room; one had to leave an hour and quarter later, but the rest remained for a total of five hours, and the test was considered a total success.

On 21 July 1886, the new Navy Minister, rear-admiral Beranger, decided that the project would be reviewed by the Centro Técnico de la Armada (Naval Technical Center), under the responsibility of Admiral Antequera. He considered a more complete study of the actuator necessary before undertaking the construction of the hull and the electric engine. He authorized Peral to carry out all the modifications that he thought worthwhile, granting him 25,000 pesetas.

On 5 March 1887, Peral communicated that the electric motor or "depth's device", as he called it, was ready. On 17 March, the Commander in Chief of Cadiz, Florencio Montojo, who headed the technical committee overseeing the machine, requested budgeting for Peral's submarine.

Construction

On 25 April 1887, the submarine's construction was finally approved by the government; the keel was laid down on La Carraca on 7 October, although work did not start until two weeks later.

Air regeneration in the interior of the submarine was accomplished by an auxiliary  engine, which passed the air through a sodium hydroxide purifier to eliminate CO2 exhaled by the crew. In addition, the pump injected oxygen when needed. The same engine which circulated air also drove the bailing pump.

The submarine dived by means of the "depth's device" which drove two shafts of vertical axes located at both ends of the hull, moved by two  electrical motors to submerge or surface, and to maintain horizontal stability submerged. The ballast tanks had a storage capacity of 8 tons, and were used to stabilize the submarine. In order to navigate, Peral used a bronze magnetic needle installed in the ceiling of the turret. The design avoided any electrical interference. He also devised a periscope, a fixed tube on the turret; by using a series of prisms, it projected the outside world to within the submarine.

The total weight of the batteries was around 30 tons.

The top speed varied with the charge of the batteries. With one-quarter charge, the submarine was able to reach , one-half , three-quarters , knots, completely charged . With no means of charging batteries while underway, such as an internal combustion engine, endurance and range were limited.

One of the original features of Peral was an underwater lamp, which enabled the crew to search the sea bottom.

The submarine was single-hulled, and the ballast tanks were located at the bottom of the hull, underneath the torpedo tube. This single torpedo tube was the only weapon in the submarine, with two watertight doors on each end so the submarine could launch a torpedo submerged. Mechanisms used for reloading were simple and fast, and the submarine had three reserves. This was almost identical to the torpedo launchers used in submarines since then. In order to avoid expenses, the torpedoes Peral launched during the trials were borrowed from torpedo boats, two from Retamosa and one from Barceló.

Trials

The Peral was launched on 8 September 1888, sixteen days before another pioneering electric submarine, the French Gymnote. On 6 March 1889 the Perals trials started, consisting of handling and surface navigation. On 7 August that year, the submarine submerged for the first time up to the turret; 18 days later fired the first trial torpedo (without warhead); on 5 December submerged to 7.5 m; on 25 December passed the first non-static dive test, sailing at a steady depth of 9.5 meters; and, in 1890 sailed underwater for one hour, reaching a maximum depth of 30 meters in trials.

On 25 June that year the Peral made two simulated engagements on the cruiser Colón, one at day and other at night. The simulated night attack was successful. The staff that evaluated the trials of the submarine submitted a report, considering its speed and range insufficient, and being especially critical about the failure of the submarine during the daylight attack and its electric motors. However, overall the report was positive, and a second submarine was ordered, again under the direction of Isaac Peral but also managed by several naval departments. Peral designed a 30-meter submarine of 130 tons, under the condition of choosing the yard where the submarine would be built and the choosing the team to build it. These conditions were not accepted by the authorities, who considered this a refusal by Peral to build the submarine. Finally they ordered Peral to return the submarine to the La Carraca yard where it was built. On 11 November 1890 a decree set the end of the projects of underwater navigation in the Spanish navy.

Similar figures of performance were only attained about a decade later in other countries. The speed and endurance of the Peral attained World War I standards (in terms of underwater, battery-powered sailing).

Preservation

In 1890 Peral was withdrawn from service, equipment removed, and the hull stored at La Carraca Arsenal. In 1913 her demolition was ordered but this was not carried out.

In 1929, Admiral Mateo García de los Reyes, first commander of the Spanish submarine forces, managed to reclaim the hull and towed it to Cartagena, putting it ashore at the submarine base.

In 1965 the authorities of Cartagena succeeded in moving the hull to the Plaza de los Héroes de Cavite.

In 2002 was moved to the Paseo Alfonso XII, in front of the port of Cartagena.

In 2013, Peral was restored and moved to the Cartagena Naval Museum.

See also
 History of submarines
 List of submarines of the Spanish Navy
 List of retired Spanish Navy ships
 Ictíneo I
 Ictíneo II

Notes

References

 Villanúa, León, 1934, Isaac Peral. El Marino Popular, colección Europa (Madrid).

Further reading

External links
Submarino Peral
 

 

Cartagena, Spain
Spanish inventions
Submarines of Spain
19th-century submarines
1888 ships
Museum ships in Spain
Ships built in Spain